Cheoin-gu is the largest gu in Yongin; it is located in the southeastern part of the city. It has four dong, two eup, and five myeon.

Under administrative districts
 Yeoksam-dong (combination of Yeokbuk-dong and Samga-dong)
 Jungang-dong (divided into Gimnyangjang-dong and Namdong)
 Yurim-dong (combination of Yubang-dong and Gorim-dong)
 Dongbu-dong (divided into Mapyeong-dong, Unhak-dong, Haegok-dong and Hodong)
 Pogok-eup
 Mohyeon-eup
 Yangji-myeon
 Wonsam-myeon
 Baegam-myeon
 Idong-eup
 Namsa-eup

List of Gu in Yongin
 Cheoin-gu
 Giheung-gu
 Suji-gu

Attractions
 The MBC Dramia located within this gu at Yongcheon-ri, Baegam-myeon. The Dramia features functional reproductions of castles, palaces and even non-elite housing from various periods of Korean history, and thus serves the filming location of MBC's historical dramas, most notably, Jumong, Queen Seondeok, Dong Yi and The Moon Embracing the Sun. When there are no active shoots, viewing tours are available to the public, which include traditional folk games, historical court dress and archery.

References 

Districts of Yongin